Zhang Shaozeng (Wade-Giles Chang Shao-ts'eng) (9 October 1879 – 21 March 1928) was a Beiyang Army general in charge of the 20th Division.

Biography
He was born in Zhili province and graduated from a Japanese military academy in 1901.  He was a known radical who advocated constitutional monarchy and supported Wu Luzhen's mutiny during the Xinhai Revolution.  He became the Progressive Party boss of Tianjin.

In 1912, he secured the loyalty of the Inner Mongolian tribes to Yuan Shikai.  He broke with Yuan during the National Protection War and was one of the first to fight against Zhang Xun's attempt to restore the Qing dynasty in 1917.

He became affiliated with Cao Kun's Zhili clique and ruled Rehe.  He and Wu Peifu advocated the return of the original National Assembly. He served as Li Yuanhong's premier in 1923.  He opposed Cao and Wu's plan to invade Guangdong to defeat Sun Yatsen's rival government, preferring to negotiate unification.  His tenure as premier in the Beiyang government was marked by greed and self-glorification and he was forced to flee to the British legation in Tianjin after his resignation.

In 1928, he was assassinated by Zhang Zuolin after he was found to have contacts with the Guominjun and Kuomintang.

1879 births
1928 deaths
People of the 1911 Revolution
Premiers of the Republic of China
Republic of China Army generals
Republic of China politicians from Hebei
Politicians from Langfang
Progressive Party (China) politicians
Generals from Hebei
Assassinated Chinese politicians